John H. Robinson (born July 25, 1955) is an American politician and businessman.  He was the 40th Mayor of Wausau, Wisconsin, and represented Wausau for four terms in the Wisconsin State Assembly.  He currently serves on the Marathon County Board of Supervisors.

Biography
Born in Wausau, Wisconsin, Robinson graduated from Newman Catholic High School. He went to University of Wisconsin–Marathon County and University of Wisconsin–Stevens Point, where he studied political science.

In 1974, at age 18, he was elected to the Wausau City Council and the Marathon County Board, the youngest person ever elected to either organization.  He served on the City Council and County Board until his election to the Wisconsin State Assembly.

In 1980, he won the open seat in the 85th Assembly District.  He was re-elected in 1982, 1984, and 1986.  In 1988 he resigned his seat in the Assembly after he was elected to a four-year term as Mayor of Wausau.

After being cited for failing to report a single-car accident, Robinson chose not to seek re-election in 1992.

After leaving the Mayor's office, he worked in insurance and environmental projects, including projects for the Wisconsin Department of Natural Resources.

In 2006, Robinson returned to elected office, winning a seat on the Marathon County Board of Supervisors.

Personal life

Robinson and his wife, Mary, live in Wausau.  They have three adult children and three grandchildren.

Electoral history

Wisconsin Assembly (1980)

| colspan="6" style="text-align:center;background-color: #e9e9e9;"| Democratic Primary, September 9, 1980

| colspan="6" style="text-align:center;background-color: #e9e9e9;"| General Election, November 4, 1980

Wisconsin Assembly (1982, 1984, 1986)

References

External links
 John Robinson, District #4 from Marathon County Board of Supervisors

1955 births
Living people
Politicians from Wausau, Wisconsin
University of Wisconsin–Stevens Point alumni
Wisconsin city council members
County supervisors in Wisconsin
Mayors of places in Wisconsin
Members of the Wisconsin State Assembly